Paul Herbert Johnson (May 18, 1935 – July 17, 2016) was an American ice hockey forward.

Career 
Johnson was a member of the United States hockey team that won the gold medal at Squaw Valley, California, during the 1960 Winter Olympics. He scored the pivotal go-ahead goal in the medal round game against Canada.

Personal life 
Johnson died on July 17, 2016 at the age of 81.

References

External links
 
 Minnesota's Mister Hockey 1953 - http://www.mnhockeyhub.com/news_article/show/106156-mister-hockey
 US Hockey Hall of Fame - http://www.ushockeyhalloffame.com/page/show/829976-paul-johnson
 Miracle on Ice 1960 - http://www.usahockeymagazine.com/article/2010-02/original-golden-boys
 
 

1935 births
2016 deaths
American men's ice hockey left wingers
Des Moines Oak Leafs players
Ice hockey players from Minnesota
Ice hockey players at the 1960 Winter Olympics
Ice hockey players at the 1964 Winter Olympics
Medalists at the 1960 Winter Olympics
Minneapolis Millers (IHL) players
Olympic gold medalists for the United States in ice hockey
People from West St. Paul, Minnesota
St. Paul Saints (IHL) players
United States Hockey Hall of Fame inductees